Peter Wallenberg may refer to:

Peter Wallenberg, Sr. (1926–2015), Swedish business leader
Peter Wallenberg, Jr. (born 1959), Swedish businessman and racing driver

See also
Peder Wallenberg (born 1935), Swedish businessman and architect